Edmund Beaver (1911 - 1993) was an Australian rugby league footballer who played in the 1930s.  He played for Balmain in the New South Wales Rugby League (NSWRL) competition.

Playing career
Beaver made his first grade debut for Balmain in Round 6 1932 against University at Birchgrove Oval scoring a try in a 26–10 victory.  Beaver would go on to become a regular starter for the club playing at either second-row or prop.  

In 1936, Balmain finished second on the table and reached the 1936 NSWRL grand final by beating North Sydney in the preliminary final.  In the grand final, Beaver played at second-row as Balmain went into the half time break down 8–6 against Eastern Suburbs.  In the second half, Eastern Suburbs scored 24 points to win the match in convincing fashion 32–12 at the Sydney Cricket Ground in front of a low crowd of 14,395.  The following season, Balmain finished in 4th place on the table in which proved to be Beaver's last season.  His final game for Balmain was a 15–5 loss against South Sydney in Round 9 1937.

References

1911 births
1993 deaths
Balmain Tigers players
Australian rugby league players
Rugby league second-rows
Rugby league props
Place of death missing
Rugby league players from Sydney